Hypsidia microspila is a moth in the family Drepanidae. It was described by Alfred Jefferis Turner in 1942. It is found in Australia.

References

Moths described in 1942
Thyatirinae